Solor Watan Lema Confederation (Solor Malay: Persekutuan Solor Watan Lema) was a confederation consisting of five Islamic kingdoms founded by the Muslim community in Solor Island to fight Portuguese colonialism on Solor Island and the surrounding area.

Member of Confederation
The following are the kingdoms that are members of the Confederation;
Lohayong Kingdom in Solor Island
Lamakera Kingdom in Solor Island
Lamahala Kingdom in Adonara Island
Terong Kingdom in Adonara Island
Labala Kingdom in Lembata Island

History

The background of the formation of the Solor Watan Lema alliance is explained in the article entitled Situs Menanga Solor Flores Timur, Jejak Islam di NTT written by Muhammad Murtadlo and published in the Journal of Religious Literature Ministry of Religious Affairs in 2017.

Murtadlo said that the Sultan of Menanga whose real name was Shahbudin ibn Ali ibn Salman Al Farisi came to Solor Island and was appointed to lead the Solor Watan Lema Confederation between 1613–1645 AD. Then Shahbudin called himself Sultan of Menanga because he ruled in the Menanga region.

This alliance itself aims to fight the Portuguese who have built a fort in Lohayong. The fort is now known as Fort Lohayong or Fort Henricus.

Previously written in his journal, the Portuguese came to Solor Island around 1561 AD. Then they built Fort Lohayong in 1566 AD. At that time the people of Solor and its surroundings asked the Sultan of Menanga to lead the resistance against the Portuguese.

The Sultan of Menanga's resistance with the Alliance against the Portuguese was supported by the Vereenigde Oostindische Compagnie (VOC) a Dutch trading company. It is known that the VOC itself had a desire to shift Portuguese power in the Lohayong area.

In return for the Sultan of Menanga, the VOC would recognize the sovereignty of the Solor Watan Lema Confederation. Regarding the VOC's goal of shifting the Portuguese, it was not separated from their interests to benefit from the departure of the Portuguese.

References

Precolonial states of Indonesia
Former sultanates
Islamic states in Indonesia
States and territories established in 1613